Adaptive dimensional search algorithms differ from nature-inspired metaheuristic techniques in the sense that they do not use any metaphor as an underlying principle for implementation. Rather, they utilize a simple, performance-oriented methodology based on the update of the search dimensionality ratio (SDR) parameter at each iteration.

Many robust metaheuristic techniques, such as simulated annealing, evolutionary algorithms, particle swarm optimization, and ant colony optimization, have been introduced by researchers in the last few decades through clearly identifying and formulating similarities between algorithms and the processes they are modeled on. However, over time this trend of developing new search methods has made researchers feel obligated to associate their innovative ideas with some natural event to provide a basis for justification of their thoughts and the originality of their algorithms. As a result, literature has abounded with metaheuristic algorithms that have weak or no similarities to the natural processes which they are purported to derive from.

References

Heuristic algorithms
Optimization algorithms and methods